Elite Two (or Cameroon Deuxième Division) called MTN Elite Two for Sponsorship reasons, is the second division of the Cameroon association football league system. It is organised by the Cameroonian Football Federation. Teams get promoted to the Elite One and get relegated to the Regional Leagues

Current Members 2021-22
Source.

References

External links
Official website 

Football leagues in Cameroon
1961 establishments in Cameroon